Emicarlo Elias de Souza (born 26 October 1981) is a Brazilian athlete who runs in the T46 class. He has a degree in Administration Studies from Universidade Potiguar, and is married to Joana Claudione with one son. Souza is a single-arm amputee.

At the 2012 Summer Paralympic Games, Souza ran with the Brazilian team in the 4 × 100 m - T42-46 relay. The team finished in second place, but was disqualified for a technical error.

References

External links
 

1981 births
Living people
Brazilian male sprinters
Paralympic athletes of Brazil
Athletes (track and field) at the 2012 Summer Paralympics
Medalists at the 2007 Parapan American Games
21st-century Brazilian people